The 14th Indian Infantry Brigade was an infantry brigade formation of the Indian Army during World War II. The brigade was formed at Attock in October 1940, and assigned to the 7th Indian Infantry Division. In April 1942, the brigade was renumbered as the 114th Indian Infantry Brigade. The brigade fought in the Burma Campaign with the 7th Indian Division and later the 26th Indian Infantry Division.

Formation

14th Indian Infantry Brigade
3rd Battalion, 9th Jat Regiment  October 1940 to March 1941
2nd Battalion, 4th Bombay Grenadiers  October 1940 to March 1941
1st Battalion, 9th Jat Regiment March to October 1941
Shamsher Dal Regiment (of the Nepalese Army) March to October 1941
7th Battalion, Jammu and Kashmir Infantry  Indian State Forces June to September 1941
1st Battalion, 7th Duke of Edinburgh's Own Gurkha Rifles July to September 1941
2nd Battalion, Worcestershire Regiment July to September 1941
Bairab Nath Regiment (of the Nepalese Army) July to September 1941
7th Battalion, 16th Punjab Regiment September 1941 to March 1942
4th Battalion, 8 Gorkha Rifles October 1941 to March 1942
9th Battalion, 11th Sikh Regiment  October 1941 to March 1942

114th Indian Infantry Brigade
4th Battalion, 14th Punjab Regiment April 1942 to February 1945
4th Battalion, 5th Gurkha Rifles April 1942 t August 1945
7th Battalion, 15th Punjab Regiment  April to October 1942
1st Battalion, Somerset Light Infantry November 1942 to April 1944
2nd Battalion, South Lancashire Regiment April 1944 to July 1945
4th Battalion, 14th Punjab Regiment  April to August 1945
4th Battalion, Queen's Own Royal West Kent Regiment June to July 1945
1st Battalion, 9th Jat Regiment July to August 1945
4th Battalion, 10th Gurkha Rifles July to August 1945

See also

 List of Indian Army Brigades in World War II

References

British Indian Army brigades
Military units and formations in Burma in World War II